Big Heat may refer to:

The Big Heat, a 1953 film noir directed by Fritz Lang
The Big Heat (1988 film), a Hong Kong action film directed by Andrew Kam
"The Big Heat" (The Batman), an episode of The Batman
The Big Heat (album), a 1986 album by Stan Ridgway
"The Big Heat" (song), a 1986 song by Stan Ridgway
Big Heat (album), a 2000 album by Leslie Cheung